Al-Safsafah is a town in northwestern Syria, administratively part of the Tartus Governorate, located southeast of Tartus and 13 kilometers north of the border with Lebanon. Nearby localities include Ayn al-Zibdeh and Kafr Fo to the southeast, al-Tulay'i to the east, Buwaydet al-Suwayqat to the northeast, Beit al-Shaykh Yunes to the north, Ayn al-Zarqa to the northwest and al-Hamidiyah to the west. According to the Syria Central Bureau of Statistics, al-Safsafah had a population of 6,011 in the 2004 census. It is the administrative center of the al-Safsafah nahiyah ("sub-district") which contained 19 localities with a collective population of 23,416 in 2004. The inhabitants are predominantly Alawites.

History
One of the principle families of the town are the Abbas family. They formerly served as aghawat ("local military leaders") during the Ottoman era.

The al-Safsafah subdistrict was detached from the Safita District and transferred to the Tartus District in 1970. During the presidency of Hafez al-Assad (1970-2000), al-Safsafah and the coastal subdistrict center of al-Hamidiyah competed for the role of capital in a newly planned mantiqah ("district") consisting of the Akkar plain of Syria.  Although no new district has yet been created, in 1994 a branch of the Agricultural Bank of Syria was opened in al-Safsafah, which is normally reserved for district capitals.

References

Populated places in Tartus District
Towns in Syria
Alawite communities in Syria